John H. A. Hoyle (1927–2012) was an Australian public servant and diplomat. Among other locations, he served in Jamaica, Bangladesh, New Zealand, Sweden and Germany.

In 1974 he was announced as the Australian Government's first resident High Commissioner to the Caribbean Commonwealth countries.

References

1927 births
2012 deaths
Australian journalists
High Commissioners of Australia to Bangladesh
High Commissioners of Australia to Barbados
High Commissioners of Australia to Jamaica
High Commissioners of Australia to Trinidad and Tobago
Ambassadors of Australia to Yugoslavia
Ambassadors of Australia to Albania